The name Hixon, Hixson or Hixton may refer to:

Hixon
 Hixon (surname)
 Hixon, British Columbia, an unincorporated community in Canada
 Hixon, Staffordshire, a village and a civil parish in England
RAF Hixon, a Royal Air Force station in Hixon, Staffordshire
Hixon railway station
Hixon rail crash in 1968
 Hixon, Clark County, Wisconsin, a town in the United States
Curtis Hixon Hall in Tampa, Florida, U.S.
Curtis Hixon Waterfront Park in Tampa, Florida, U.S.
Gideon C. Hixon House in La Crosse, Wisconsin, U.S.
Hixon Green in Hove, East Sussex, UK
Orval Hixon (1884-1982), photographer

Hixson
 Hixson (surname)
 Hixson, Tennessee, an unincorporated community
Hixson High School
Hixson–Lied College of Fine and Performing Arts in Nebraska
Hixson–Mixsell House, listed on the NRHP in Warren County, New Jersey
Hixson–Skinner Mill Complex, listed on the NRHP in Warren County, New Jersey

Hixton
 Hixton, Wisconsin (village)
 Hixton (town), Wisconsin

See also
 Hickson (disambiguation)